Itaru Chimura (born 15 April 1975) is a Japanese snowboarder. He competed in the men's snowboard cross event at the 2006 Winter Olympics.

References

1975 births
Living people
Japanese male snowboarders
Olympic snowboarders of Japan
Snowboarders at the 2006 Winter Olympics
People from Nagano (city)
21st-century Japanese people